The Harrison High School is a public high school serving ninth through twelve grade students in Harrison, Arkansas, United States.

The Old Harrison High School was built in 1912 and listed on the National Register of Historic Places in 2007.  It was designed by architects Harry C. Schwebke and R.D. Pollard in Prairie School and International Style architecture. The building served as the high school until 1952 before becoming the junior high through 1987. Soon thereafter, the site continues to serve the community as the Boone County Heritage Museum operated by the Boone County Historical and Railroad Society.

Academics 
Harrison High School provides a comprehensive education for students in grades nine through twelve, which is accredited by AdvancED and the Arkansas Department of Education (ADE). Students are engaged in regular and Advanced Placement (AP) coursework and exams prior to graduation.

Extracurricular activities 
The Harrison High School mascot is the Golden Goblin with blue and gold as its school colors. The Harrison Golden Goblins participate in interscholastic activities In the 5A West Conference under the administration of the Arkansas Activities Association.  The Golden Goblins sport teams include baseball, basketball (boys/girls), cheerleading, cross country (boys/girls), debate, football, golf (boys/girls), soccer (boys/girls), softball, speech, tennis (boys/girls), track (boys/girls), and volleyball.

 Cross country: The girls cross country team is one of the state's most successful with nine state championships between 1993 and 2003, including a state record eight consecutive titles (1993–2000).
 Basketball: The girls basketball team captured three consecutive state championships in 2000, 2001, and 2002.
 Baseball: The baseball team won its first state baseball championship in 2008, with head coach Kirk Bock being awarded the District 6 Baseball Coach of the Year by the National High School Baseball Coaches of America.
 Soccer: As of the 2012 season, the boys soccer team is the state's only boys team with six state soccer championships winning 5A classification titles in spring 2002–2006 and 2008. The girls team are 3-time state champions with 5A titles in 2002, 2004 and 2011. Harrison boasts the 2010 NSCAA Arkansas Girls High School Player of the Year award winner.

Notable alumni 
 C.D. Wright - Poet

 F. Sheridan Garrison - Business Leader, founder of Arkansas Freightways, which became American Freightways and then was acquired by FedEx, becoming FedEx Freight. A Harrison native, Garrison followed his time at HHS by becoming an honors graduate of the University of Arkansas College of Business (now called the Sam M. Walton College of Business. 

 Brandon Burlsworth - Offensive Lineman for the University of Arkansas. Drafted by the Indianapolis Colts with the 63rd pick in the 1999 NFL Draft. Tragically killed in an automobile accident near Alpena in April 1999.

References

School buildings on the National Register of Historic Places in Arkansas
Public high schools in Arkansas
Educational institutions established in 1912
Prairie School architecture in Arkansas
International style architecture in Arkansas
Buildings and structures in Harrison, Arkansas
1912 establishments in Arkansas
National Register of Historic Places in Boone County, Arkansas